Anabarilius brevianalis is a species of cyprinid fish from the Jinsha River basin in China.

References

Anabarilius
Endemic fauna of China
Freshwater fish of China
Cyprinid fish of Asia
Fish described in 1992
Taxa named by Zhou Wei (zoologist)
Taxa named by Cui Gui-Hua